Christian Derflinger (born 2 February 1994) is an Austrian footballer who plays for Kickers Offenbach in the German Regionalliga Südwest.

References

1994 births
Footballers from Linz
Living people
Austrian footballers
Austria youth international footballers
Austria under-21 international footballers
Association football midfielders
LASK players
FC Bayern Munich II players
Hamburger SV II players
SV Grödig players
SpVgg Greuther Fürth players
FC Viktoria Köln players
SV Rödinghausen players
VSG Altglienicke players
Kickers Offenbach players
Regionalliga players
Austrian Football Bundesliga players
2. Bundesliga players
Austrian expatriate footballers
Expatriate footballers in Germany
Austrian expatriate sportspeople in Germany